Robert Lee Wells (born November 1, 1966), is an American former professional baseball pitcher who played in Major League Baseball (MLB) from –. He went on to play for the Minnesota Twins, Philadelphia Phillies, and Seattle Mariners.

External links

1966 births
Living people
American expatriate baseball players in Canada
Baseball players from Washington (state)
Calgary Cannons players
Clearwater Phillies players
Edmonton Trappers players
Major League Baseball pitchers
Martinsville Phillies players
Minnesota Twins players
Philadelphia Phillies players
Reading Phillies players
Scranton/Wilkes-Barre Red Barons players
Seattle Mariners players
Spartanburg Phillies players
Spokane Falls Bigfoot baseball players
Wisconsin Timber Rattlers players